Luis Casíllas (born 7 June 1905, date of death unknown) was a Mexican modern pentathlete. He competed at the 1936 Summer Olympics. Casíllas later became a General in the Mexican Army, and was the commander of the Military Zone of Chiapas.

References

External links
 

1905 births
Year of death missing
Mexican male modern pentathletes
Olympic modern pentathletes of Mexico
Modern pentathletes at the 1936 Summer Olympics